Pinthaeus sanguinipes is a species of stink bug (family Pentatomidae).

Description
These stink bugs  overwinter as adults, females lay their eggs in May and the adults are present from August. Adults of these red-legged bugs prey on other insect and they mainly feed on the larvae of beetles, sawflies and butterflies, especially on the larvae of the lymantriid Dasychira pudibunda.

Distribution
This species is present in most of Europe.

Habitat
This quite rare stink bug prefers the edges of the forest of deciduous trees and can be usually be found on the foliage of trees and shrubs.

References 

 QING ZHAO, DÁVID RÉDEI, WENJUN BU A revision of the genus Pinthaeus (Hemiptera: Heteroptera: Pentatomidae)

External links
 Biolib
 Fauna Europaea
 Faunarb.info
 Cabdirect

Pentatomidae
Insects described in 1781
Hemiptera of Europe